"Kickstarts" is a song by British singer Example. This is the third single from Example's second album, Won't Go Quietly. The song was available to download on 13 June 2010, with a physical single release on 14 June 2010. Production was handled by British drum and bass musician Sub Focus.

Critical reception
Robert Copsey of Digital Spy gave the song a positive review stating:

Having scored that all-important breakthrough hit with 'Won't Go Quietly' earlier this year, Elliot 'Example' Gleave now faces the tricky task of following it up. The Londoner recently told us he was gunning for plenty of radio play and a well-received video with this one – but does 'Kickstarts' warrant that kind of attention?

The answer is a resounding "Yes!" Example reckons producer Sub Focus has brought a "hardcore club edge to a lyrically poppy single" here – and he's not wrong, with lines like "You're my girl in a golden crown / Princess I don't wanna let you down" cloaked in loads of clubby beats and a squiggly synth riff. It all adds up to a self-proclaimed slice of "grown-up rave" that's as refreshing as sipping a pint of cider in a pub garden on a hot summer's day. Nice .

Track listing

Chart performance
"Kickstarts" debuted on the Irish Singles Chart at number 8 on 18 June 2010, marking Example's most successful single in the country, after "Won't Go Quietly" reached a peak of number 36 in January 2010. Likewise, "Kickstarts" received similar success on the UK Singles Chart, debuting at number 3 beating the previous single's peak of number 6, but also at number one on the UK Dance Chart and UK Indie Chart, marking his second consecutive number one on both charts. The single also managed to reach a peak of number 11 on the European Hot 100 Singles chart.

Charts and certifications

Weekly charts

Year-end charts

Certifications

See also
 List of number-one dance hits of 2010 (UK)
 List of number-one indie hits of 2010 (UK)

Release history

References

2010 singles
Example (musician) songs
2010 songs
Songs written by Example (musician)
Data Records singles